Kerala beef fry is a dish made of beef, slow-roasted in a mixture of spices, onions, curry leaves, and coconut slivers, fried in coconut oil. The dish is also popularly known in Kerala as "Beef Ullarthiyathu".

Origin
The dishes origins can be traced back to AD 52, after which Syrian Christians have been known to have settled in Kerala, however the first Jewish settlers arrived in Kerala as early as 6th century BC, and brought with them Kosher cattle slaughter techniques, which could have also led to the development of the recipe.

Preparation
The dish is prepared by cooking chunks of meat in a mixture of spices which include turmeric, coriander, garam masala, black pepper, red chilli, cooked along with onions, shallots, ginger and garlic. Slivers of coconut, fried in coconut oil and curry leaves are also used for garnish. The meat is usually cooked in a pressure cooker to soften it before it is slow roasted in the mixture of spices, till it reaches a dry consistency.

Combinations
Kerala beef fry is most commonly eaten with kerala porotta, whereas in some parts such as Thrippunithura, the dish has been combined with pazham pori and has become a very popular combo in the region.

Controversy
Kerala beef fry, has found itself in the middle of many a controversy in India, with the central Government banning the slaughter of cattle. However, electoral candidates from the same ruling party went to great lengths to assure their voters that beef would be supplied in the most hygienic conditions. 

In Kerala, where the dish is most popular lawmakers attended a special breakfast where Kerala beef fry was served, before discussing the ban at a special session called for the purpose
National award-winning actress Surabhi Lakshmi was also in the center of a controversy, where news was published that she ate beef fry during the Onam festival.

A photograph of K. Surendran of the Bharatiya Janata Party which supports a ban on beef and cow slaughter, eating beef during an election campaign went viral, however he denied the same stating that it was onion curry. 
However, Sobha Surendran, has clarified that eating beef is OK.

References 

Beef dishes
 Indian cuisine
Kerala cuisine